Iva may refer to:
 Iva, Heris, East Azerbaijan Province
 Iva, Sarab, East Azerbaijan Province
 Iva, Mazandaran